Astragalus glycyphyllos (liquorice milkvetch, wild liquorice, wild licorice) is a flowering plant in the family Fabaceae, native to Europe. It is a perennial herbaceous plant which is sometimes used for tea.

External links
Plants For A Future: Astragalus glycyphyllos
USDA Plants Profile: Astragalus glycyphyllos

glycyphyllos
Flora of Europe
Plants described in 1753
Taxa named by Carl Linnaeus